A Navel City/No One Is There is a collaborative album by Hoppy Kamiyama and Bill Laswell, released in May 2004 by Creage.

Track listing

Personnel 
Adapted from the A Navel City/No One Is There liner notes.
Musicians
Hoppy Kamiyama – Digital President, asshole box, Slide Geisha, gram pot, producer
Bill Laswell – bass guitar, effects, producer, mixing
Kiyohiko Semba – drums, electronic drums, percussion
Technical personnel
Michael Fossenkemper – mastering
Kio Griffith – design
Yoshiaki Kondo – recording
Robert Musso – engineering
Kyoko Ohya – design
Alex Theoret – mastering

Release history

References

External links 
 A Navel City/No One Is There at Bandcamp
 

2004 albums
Collaborative albums
Hoppy Kamiyama albums
Bill Laswell albums
Albums produced by Hoppy Kamiyama
Albums produced by Bill Laswell